The Jena tramway network is a network of tramways forming part of the public transport system in Jena, a city in the federal state of Thuringia, Germany.

It has five lines in operation.

Lines 
On 17 December 2009, a new network of lines was introduced to coincide with the opening of the new Göschwitz–Burgau line. Since December 2017 all lines are also operated in the evening/overnight.

 
Lines 1 and 4 operate in fliegende Wechsel (flying exchange): i.e., at Lobeda-West all trams arriving on one of these lines departs on the other.

Rolling stock
The fleet of the Jena tram network consists of 33 Adtranz GT6M trams, and five Solaris Tramino trams. In 2019, Jenaer Nahverkehr and the City of Jena announced preparations for an invitation of tenders for new trams, which are due to be delivered from 2022.

See also
List of town tramway systems in Germany
Trams in Germany

References

Notes

Bibliography

External links

 
 

Jena
Jena
Transport in Thuringia
Metre gauge railways in Germany
Jena